Destinee Dante Hooker (born September 7, 1987) is an American indoor volleyball player.  She is a  opposite attacker. Hooker was a member of the United States women's national volleyball team. She starred in both volleyball and track and field at the University of Texas.

Career

High school
Hooker attended Southwest High School in Texas, where she was a standout athlete in basketball, track and field, and volleyball. As a junior and senior, she was an all-state volleyball outside hitter. She was also the 2004 and 2005 Texas state champion in the high jump.

College
Hooker played on the University of Texas volleyball team from 2006 to 2009. In 2007, she was named to the AVCA All-American second team. She was then named to the first team in both 2008 and 2009. In 2009, she was the Big 12 Player of the Year and the NCAA Division I volleyball championship's Most Outstanding Player, as Texas lost to Penn State in the finals. While at Texas, Hooker was named as one of the four finalists for the Honda Sports Award in volleyball for both the 2008–09 season as well as the 2009–10 season.

In track and field, Hooker won the NCAA outdoor high jump championship in 2006, 2007, and 2009. She also won the NCAA indoor high jump championship in 2009; her winning jump of 6' 6" (1.98 meters) broke the indoor collegiate record. She won four NCAA high jump championships overall.

International
Hooker joined the U.S. women's national volleyball team in January 2008. Her first official tournament with the team was the 2010 World Grand Prix, where she helped the U.S. win the gold medal by averaging 4.76 points and 2.46 digs. She was also fifth in scoring at that year's FIVB Volleyball Women's World Championship. 
In 2011, Hooker was named the Most Valuable Player of the FIVB World Grand Prix, as the Americans won the tournament again. She ranked second with 101 points scored during the Final Round. Hooker averaged 5.91 points and 5.13 kills in the FIVB World Cup to help the U.S. to the silver medal in that event. She was named the Best Spiker in the World Cup with a 49.53 kill percent and .419 hitting efficiency.

Hooker played in the first six matches of the 2012 FIVB World Grand Prix, which the U.S. eventually won. Hooker then won the silver medal with the U.S. in the 2012 Summer Olympics. She ranked second overall in scoring in that tournament and won the Best Spiker award.

Personal
Hooker was born in Frankfurt, Germany, and resides in San Antonio, Texas. Her sister, Marshevet Hooker, is a track and field athlete who competed in the 2008 Summer Olympics.

Awards

Individual
 2011 World Grand Prix "Most Valuable Player"
 2011 World Cup "Best Spiker"
 2012 Summer Olympics "Best Spiker"
 2016/17 Brazilian Superliga "Best Spiker"

Club
 2011–12 Superliga -  Champion, with Sollys/Nestlé (Osasco)
 2012–13 CEV Women's Challenge Cup -  Champion, with Dinamo Krasnodar

College
Two-time AVCA All-America first team (2008, 2009)
2007 AVCA All-America second team
2009 Most Outstanding Player at the NCAA Division I championship
2008 NCAA Championship All-Tournament team
2008–09 Big 12 Conference Female Athlete of the Year
2008–09 Finalist for Honda Sports Award (volleyball)
2009–10 Finalist for Honda Sports Award (volleyball)
2009 Big 12 Player of the Year

References

1987 births
Living people
Olympic silver medalists for the United States in volleyball
Volleyball players at the 2012 Summer Olympics
Medalists at the 2012 Summer Olympics
Texas Longhorns women's track and field athletes
Texas Longhorns women's volleyball players
Sportspeople from Frankfurt
African-American volleyball players
Expatriate volleyball players in South Korea
American women's volleyball players
American expatriate sportspeople in Germany
Opposite hitters
Expatriate volleyball players in Italy
Expatriate volleyball players in Brazil
Expatriate volleyball players in Russia
Expatriate volleyball players in China
American expatriate sportspeople in South Korea
American expatriate sportspeople in Italy
American expatriate sportspeople in Brazil
American expatriate sportspeople in Russia
American expatriate sportspeople in China
21st-century African-American sportspeople
21st-century African-American women
20th-century African-American people
20th-century African-American women